Marlene le Roux (born 17 September 1967) is a South African disability and women's rights activist. She is co-founder of the Women’s Achievement Network for Disability, and CEO of the Artscape Theatre Centre in Cape Town.

Biography
Marlene le Roux was born in Wellington, Western Cape, 17 September 1967. At three months old, le Roux contracted poliomyelitis which left her with a weakened leg for which she wears a brace. She matriculated at Bergrivier Secondary School then went on to earn a B.Mus. degree in 1988 and a Higher Diploma in Education in 1989 followed by a B.Ed. in 1991, all at the University of the Western Cape. In 2002 and 2003 le Roux continued her education with a Diploma in Management and a Diploma in Senior Management from the University of Stellenbosch.

Le Roux served as an international expert on the London Olympic Committee and Arts Council England to select arts projects for the London Olympics and Paralympics 2012.

Le Roux and Karen Smit launched the Women’s Achievement Network for Disability, in August 2014, "to raise the profile and awareness of disabled women and girls in South Africa, so that their human rights may be advanced and promoted".

Selected works
  Featuring stories of 23 women with various disabilities, the photography is by Lucie Pavlovich.
  Everyday life in Mitchells Plain, a large township on the outskirts of Cape Town.
  About the minstrel history in the town of Wellington, Western Cape.

Awards and honours
 Shoprite/Checkers Woman of the Year – Art Category, 1998
 Desmond Tutu Legendary Award, 2001
 Chevalier des Ordre des Arts et des Lettres, a French Knighthood in the Performing Arts, 2002
 Alumni of the Year 2003, University of Stellenbosch
 Western Cape Provincial Award, Arts & Culture, 2005
 Honorary Membership in the Golden Key International Honour Society at the University of Stellenbosch, 2007   
 Alumnus of the Year 2007, for excellence in Management, University of Stellenbosch Business School, 2008
 CEO Magazine Awards.  SA’s most Influential Women in Business and Government.  Recognition of achievement in the Arts & Culture Sector, 2010
 Ordre National Du Merite from the French Government, 2012
 German Africa Prize from the German Government for work done in disadvantaged communities, 2012
 Honorary doctorate in education from Cape Peninsula University of Technology, 2017
 Commonwealth Point of Light Award, 2018.

References 

1934 births
Living people
South African disability rights activists
South African women's rights activists
Women theatre directors
South African theatre directors
Stellenbosch University alumni
University of the Western Cape alumni
South African people with disabilities